The 4th IPC Ice Sledge Hockey World Championships were held between March 29, 2008, and April 5, 2008, in Marlborough, Massachusetts, United States, at the New England Sports Center. Organized by Massachusetts Hockey in co-operation with US Paralympics, around 200 athletes from ten countries participated in the 10-team round robin tournament which featured two divisions: six teams in group A and four teams in group B.

A Tournament
The A Tournament was held between Canada, Germany, Italy, Japan, Norway and the United States, all teams which had competed at the Torino 2006 Paralympic Winter Games and which were then-ranked as the world's best sledge hockey teams.

Final rankings

Preliminary round

Standings

 PIM, SHOTS and SV counted in 6 games

Schedule
All times are local (UTC-5)

Final round 
5th place playoff

Bronze medal game

Gold medal game

B Tournament
The B Tournament was held between Czech Republic, Estonia, South Korea and Poland, the second tier elite teams all vying for a position in the 2009 IPC Ice Sledge Hockey World Championships A Tournament.

Final rankings

Preliminary round

Standings

Schedule
All times are local (UTC-5)

Final round 
9th place playoff

7th place playoff

See also
 Ice sledge hockey
 Ice hockey#Sledge hockey
 Ice sledge hockey at the 2006 Winter Paralympics
 2004 IPC Ice Sledge Hockey World Championships

External links
 Official Page
 Game stats
 Best Scenes of Ice Sledge Hockey Championships Available on PSTV
  Highlights on the new Paralympicsport TV
 Paralympic.org Press Releases - Ice Sledge Hockey World Championships in Marlborough
 Vancouver 2010 - World Championship Ice Sledge Hockey 
 New England Sports Center

Ice hockey in Massachusetts
IPC Ice Sledge Hockey World Championships
Sports in Marlborough, Massachusetts
International ice hockey competitions hosted by the United States
World Para Ice Hockey Championships
IPC Ice Sledge Hockey World Championships
IPC Ice Sledge Hockey World Championships
Sports competitions in Massachusetts
IPC Ice Sledge Hockey World Championships
IPC Ice Sledge Hockey World Championships